Miss USA 2017 was the 66th Miss USA pageant. It was held on May 14, 2017 at the Mandalay Bay Events Center in Las Vegas, Nevada. Terrence J and Julianne Hough served as hosts, while Ashley Graham also returned as backstage host, all for a second consecutive year. Brett Eldredge, Pitbull, and the cast of Michael Jackson: One by Cirque du Soleil performed.

Deshauna Barber of the District of Columbia crowned her successor Kára McCullough, also of the District of Columbia, at the end of the event. This was District of Columbia's fourth Miss USA title, and also this was the first time since 2008 to have a second consecutive African Americans have been crowned. McCullough represented the United States at the Miss Universe 2017 competition, placed in the top 10. This is the first back to back win for a state at Miss USA since Texas won the crown in 1988 and 1989.

Background

Selection of participants
Delegates from 50 states and the District of Columbia were selected in state pageants began in July 2016 and ended in February 2017. The first state pageant was Florida, held on July 16, 2016, and the final pageant was Alaska, held on February 4, 2017; eight of them were former Miss Teen USA state winners, three of them were former Miss America state titleholders and one of them was a former Miss America's Outstanding Teen state titleholder.

One state titleholder was appointed as replacement after the original titleholder was unable to compete. Génesis Dávila was the original winner of Miss Florida USA 2017, she was disqualified shortly after winning the title and was revealed she hired professional makeup artists instead by to do herself. She was replaced by Linette De Los Santos, the first runner-up of Miss Florida USA 2017 pageant. Dávila would later win the title the following year and competed in Miss USA 2018.

Results

Awards

Order of announcements

Top 10

Top 5

Top 3

Historical significance 
 District of Columbia wins competition for the fourth time and twice in a row.
 New Jersey earns the 1st runner-up position for the second time. The last time it placed was in 1991.
 Minnesota earns the 2nd runner-up position for the second time. The last time it placed was in 1977.
 South Carolina finishes as Top 5 for the second time. The last time it placed was in 1999.
 Illinois finishes as Top 5 for the second time. The last time it placed was in 1991.
 States that placed in semifinals the previous year were California, District of Columbia, Missouri and South Carolina. All of them made their second consecutive placement.
 Illinois and New York last placed in 2015.
 Minnesota, New Jersey and Tennessee last placed in 2014.
 Alaska last placed in 1990.
 Hawaii breaks an ongoing streak of placements since 2015.
 Arizona, Oklahoma and Virginia, break an ongoing streak of placements since 2014.
 Alabama breaks an ongoing streak of placements since 2010.

Pageant

Preliminary competition
Prior to the final competition, the delegates compete in the preliminary competition, which involves private interviews with the judges and a presentation show where they compete in swimsuit and evening gown. It was held on May 11, 2017 on the official Miss USA YouTube channel and was hosted by Entertainment reporter and Miss Wisconsin USA 2009 Alex Wehrley and Deshauna Barber.

Judges
 Halima Aden – Somali-American model and first woman to compete in a Miss USA state pageant wearing a hijab and burkini
 Maura McGreevy – IMG corporate community
 Carole Gist – Miss USA 1990
 Nancy Lublin – CEO of Crisis Text Line
 Brook Lee –  Miss USA 1997 and Miss Universe 1997
 Nick Light – Vice president of Sony Music and Warner Bros. Records
 Vanessa Gringer – Director of business development at IMG

Finals
For the first time since 2003, the number of finalists decreased to 10 from 15 in the previous year. The top 10 finalists compete in both swimsuit and evening gown, while the top 5 are in a qualifying question, and the final 3 are subjected in the final question round and a final runway, the winner is decided by a panel of judges.

Judges
 Halima Aden – Somali-American model and first woman to compete in a Miss USA state pageant wearing a hijab and burkini
 Carson Kressley – TV personality, style expert, fashion designer and author
 Brook Lee – Miss USA 1997 and Miss Universe 1997
 Nancy Lublin –  Founder of Dress for Success
 Jeannie Mai – Style expert, philanthropist, and co-host of The Real
 Janet Mock –  Author, television host and advocate

Contestants
Contestant stats provided via the Miss Universe Organization.

International broadcasters

Television
: Fox
Africa: DSTV Mzansi Magic (delayed broadcast)
Asia-Pacific: Star World
: Venevisión

General references

References

External links

 Miss USA official website

2017
May 2017 events in the United States
2017 beauty pageants
Beauty pageants in the United States
2017 in Nevada